Razun (also Romanized as Rāzūn; also known as Rāzān) is a village in Piveh Zhan Rural District, Ahmadabad District, Mashhad County, Razavi Khorasan Province, Iran. At the 2006 census, its population was 289, in 73 families.

References 

Populated places in Mashhad County